Long Way From Home is an album by Peter Cincotti, released in 2017. It is Cincotti's fifth album.

Track listing

References

Peter Cincotti albums
2017 albums